Brookings-Harbor High School (BHHS) is a public high school located in Brookings, Oregon, United States.

Attendance 
Brookings-Harbor High School serves the city of Brookings and the surrounding area, including the community of Harbor. The school's attendance as of 2013 is approximately 550 students. The school has experienced steady declining enrollment for several years.

Academics
In 2014, 90% of the school's seniors received their high school diploma. Of 162 students, 145 graduated, 5 dropped out, 2 received a modified diploma, and 8 went on to receive higher education. The school is ranked in the 15th percentile among Oregon high schools and is below average.

Athletics

State championships
Boys Baseball 2020-2021

References

High schools in Curry County, Oregon
Brookings, Oregon
Public high schools in Oregon